Ja'far ibn Ali ibn Hamdun al-Andalusi was a governor of M'Sila for the Fatimid Caliphate, who in 971 defected to the rival Umayyad Caliphate of Córdoba. He was assassinated in 982 by the Umayyad chamberlain, Almanzor.

References

Sources

Further reading
 

10th-century births
982 deaths
10th-century people from the Fatimid Caliphate
Governors of the Fatimid Caliphate
10th-century Ismailis
10th-century Arabs
Banu Judham
People from the Caliphate of Córdoba